Miller Creek is a stream in St. Louis County, in the U.S. state of Minnesota. It is a tributary of the Saint Louis River.

Miller Creek was named for Robert P. Miller, an officer during the Civil War.

See also
List of rivers of Minnesota

References

Rivers of St. Louis County, Minnesota
Rivers of Minnesota